

Crown
Head of State - Queen Elizabeth II

Federal government
Governor General - Jeanne Sauvé

Cabinet
Prime Minister -  Brian Mulroney
Deputy Prime Minister - Erik Nielsen
Minister of Finance - Michael Wilson
Secretary of State for External Affairs - Joe Clark
Secretary of State for Canada - Walter McLean then Benoît Bouchard
Minister of National Defence - Robert Coates then Erik Nielsen
Minister of National Health and Welfare - Jake Epp
Minister of Regional Industrial Expansion - Sinclair Stevens
Minister of the Environment - Suzanne Blais-Grenier then Thomas McMillan
Minister of Justice - John Crosbie
Minister of Transport - Don Mazankowski
Minister of Communications - Marcel Masse then Benoît Bouchard then Marcel Masse
Minister of Fisheries and Oceans - John Fraser then Erik Nielsen (acting) then Tom Siddon
Minister of Agriculture - John Wise
Minister of Public Works - Roch LaSalle
Minister of Employment and Immigration - Flora MacDonald
Minister of Indian Affairs and Northern Development - David Crombie
Minister of Energy, Mines and Resources - Pat Carney
Minister of State (Forestry) - Gerald Merrithew

Parliament
See: 33rd Canadian parliament

Party leaders
Progressive Conservative Party of Canada -  Brian Mulroney
Liberal Party of Canada - John Turner
New Democratic Party- Ed Broadbent

Supreme Court Justices
Chief Justice: Brian Dickson
William McIntyre
Bertha Wilson
Antonio Lamer
Gérard V. La Forest (sworn in January 16)
John Sopinka
Jean Beetz
Julien Chouinard
Gerald Eric Le Dain

Other
Speaker of the House of Commons - John William Bosley
Governor of the Bank of Canada - Gerald Bouey
Chief of the Defence Staff - General G.C.E. Thériault

Provinces

Premiers
Premier of Alberta - Peter Lougheed then Don Getty
Premier of British Columbia - Bill Bennett
Premier of Manitoba - Howard Pawley
Premier of New Brunswick - Richard Hatfield
Premier of Newfoundland - Brian Peckford
Premier of Nova Scotia - John Buchanan
Premier of Ontario - Bill Davis then Frank Miller then David Peterson
Premier of Prince Edward Island - James Lee
Premier of Quebec - René Lévesque then Pierre-Marc Johnson then Robert Bourassa
Premier of Saskatchewan - Grant Devine

Lieutenant-governors
Lieutenant-Governor of Alberta - Frank C. Lynch-Staunton then Helen Hunley
Lieutenant-Governor of British Columbia - Robert Gordon Rogers
Lieutenant-Governor of Manitoba - Pearl McGonigal
Lieutenant-Governor of New Brunswick - George F.G. Stanley
Lieutenant-Governor of Newfoundland and Labrador - William Anthony Paddon
Lieutenant-Governor of Nova Scotia -Alan Abraham
Lieutenant-Governor of Ontario - John Black Aird then Lincoln Alexander
Lieutenant-Governor of Prince Edward Island - Joseph Aubin Doiron then Robert Lloyd George MacPhail
Lieutenant-Governor of Quebec - Gilles Lamontagne
Lieutenant-Governor of Saskatchewan - Sylvia Fedoruk

Mayors
Toronto - Art Eggleton
Montreal - Jean Drapeau
Vancouver - Michael Harcourt
Ottawa - Marion Dewar then James A. Durrell

Religious leaders
Roman Catholic Bishop of Quebec - Cardinal Archbishop Louis-Albert Vachon
Roman Catholic Bishop of Montreal -  Cardinal Archbishop Paul Grégoire
Roman Catholic Bishops of London - Bishop John Michael Sherlock
Moderator of the United Church of Canada - Robert F. Smith

See also
1984 Canadian incumbents
Events in Canada in 1985
1986 Canadian incumbents
 Governmental leaders in 1985
 Canadian incumbents by year

1985
Incumbents
Canadian leaders